The 1870 Roxburghshire by-election was fought on 2 March 1870.  The by-election was fought due to the resignation of the incumbent Liberal MP, Sir William Scott.  It was won by the unopposed Liberal candidate Marquess of Bowmont.

References

Roxburghshire by-election
1870s elections in Scotland
Roxburgh
Politics of the Scottish Borders
Roxburghshire by-election
Roxburghshire by-election
By-elections to the Parliament of the United Kingdom in Scottish constituencies
Unopposed by-elections to the Parliament of the United Kingdom in Scottish constituencies